Bloomeria, a geophyte in the family Asparagaceae, subfamily Brodiaeoideae, was named for Hiram Green Bloomer (1819–1874) an early San Francisco botanist.

Species
It consists of three species native to California and Baja California:

References

External links

USDA Plants Profile for Bloomeria
Flora of North America Profile

 
Asparagaceae genera
Flora of Baja California
Flora of California
Natural history of the California chaparral and woodlands
Taxa named by Albert Kellogg